Stewart Lines is a British racing driver currently competing in the 2019 Britcar Endurance Championship. He has also raced in the British Touring Car Championship, made his debut in 2015

Racing career

Lines began his touring car career in the 2007 SEAT Cupra Championship season, he raced in the championship as guest driver for one round only. Later in 2007 he raced in the 2007 Renault Clio Cup GB Winter Series ending 9th in the standings. In 2011 he switched to the Volkswagen Racing Cup GB, he finished 3rd in the standings in 2013, with 478 points. In March 2015, it was announced that Lines would make his British Touring Car Championship debut with Houseman Racing driving a Toyota Avensis.

Lines was part of the first ever front-wheel drive winning team of the 750 Motor Club Birkett Relay in 2018. Cupra Racing formed a team of Seat Cupra TCR cars piloted by Carl Swift, Shayne Deegan, Lee Deegan and Stewart Lines and won the event by just half a second, beating Sports Prototype teams.

In 2017, Lines entered into Britcar in a SEAT León TCR. He drove in two rounds of the season as an invitation entry. Tom Walker and Oliver Taylor drove the car as a points-eligible entry at Oulton Park in round six. 
In 2018, Lines entered the Dunlop Endurance Championship in a Maximum Motorsport-run SEAT Cupra TCR, in Class 4, with fellow BTCC-driver Adam Morgan and later Mat Jackson. For the 2019 season, Lines entered the Dunlop Endurance Championship with Ollie Taylor for Maximum Motorsport in a SEAT León TCR TCR, again running in Class 4.

Lines' team Maximum Motorsport organises and, with Maximum Networks, a tech-savvy communications company, heavily sponsors the VW Racing Cup and operates the Dunlop Touring Car Trophy alongside the TCR UK series, also being one of the main sponsors. His team also competes in the aforementioned championships and the Britcar Endurance Championship with TCR-spec cars, in which they were in contention for the 2019 title, winning the Class 4 title.

Racing record

Complete British Touring Car Championship results
(key) (Races in bold indicate pole position – 1 point awarded just in first race; races in italics indicate fastest lap – 1 point awarded all races; * signifies that driver led race for at least one lap – 1 point given all races)

Complete Britcar results
(key) (Races in bold indicate pole position in class – 1 point awarded just in first race; races in italics indicate fastest lap in class – 1 point awarded all races;-

† Ineligible for points as he was an invitation entry.

Complete TCR UK/Touring Car Trophy results
(key) (Races in bold indicate pole position – 1 point awarded just in first race; races in italics indicate fastest lap – 1 point awarded all races; * signifies that driver led race for at least one lap – 1 point given all races)

TCR Spa 500 results

References

External links
 

1963 births
Living people
British Touring Car Championship drivers
English racing drivers
British racing drivers
Britcar drivers
Ginetta GT4 Supercup drivers
Mini Challenge UK drivers